JumpStart (known as Jump Ahead in the United Kingdom) is an educational media franchise for children, consisting mostly of educational games, produced by JumpStart Games. The series originally consisted of a series of educational PC games but has since expanded to include workbooks, direct-to-video films, mobile apps, and other media, including a massive multiplayer online game located at JumpStart.com, that were launched on March 10, 2009.

History

Early era (1994–1997) 
The first game in the early learning software series, JumpStart Kindergarten, was created in 1994 by independent developer, Fanfare Software (founded 1988), and published by Knowledge Adventure (founded 1991). Afterwards, Fanfare was also known to have developed two more games; JumpStart Preschool and JumpStart 1st Grade before being acquired by Knowledge Adventure on August 9, 1995. Later, Fanfare founder and chairman, Barton Listick, became vice president of Knowledge Adventure, while his staff had relocated to Knowledge Adventure's headquarters in Glendale, California. Meanwhile, Knowledge Adventure founder, Bill Gross, hoped the acquisition would allow the JumpStart series to expand into international markets, as well as multiple platforms and online,  to supplement the home and school markets. During this period of time, Listick was also optimistic that the added resources of the larger organisation would allow him to create a "JumpStart Elementary School" of compelling and exciting children's software. Microtimes retrospectively wrote that the acquisition of the early learning products augmented Knowledge Adventure's strengths. In October 1995, Steve Chadima, vice president of marketing services at Knowledge Adventure, said that while JumpStart sales were strong, and the series was about to be extended with JumpStart 2nd Grade. He said: "We're testing concepts for third grade to see if it is viable...I don't know if this is going to work with higher grade levels." However, JumpStart Adventures 3rd Grade: Mystery Mountain would end up being released in 1996, and many higher grade games followed. According to the Chicago Sun-Times, Knowledge Adventure "started the baby trend when it introduced JumpStart Toddlers in 1996". On February 3, 1997, the privately held Knowledge Adventure was acquired by CUC International, becoming a wholly owned subsidiary of the CUC Software division alongside Davidson & Associates, Blizzard Entertainment, and Sierra On-Line; CUC Software would be the label that marketed the JumpStart games. JumpStart Typing, JumpStart Spanish, JumpStart Kindergarten II, JumpStart 1st Grade Reading, JumpStart 1st Grade Math, JumpStart 2nd Grade Math and JumpStart 5th Grade were premiered at the 1997 Electronic Entertainment Expo.

Contemporary era (2009–present) 
After launching JumpStart 3D Virtual World in 2009, Knowledge Adventure noted they were adding online worlds and casual mobile games, console games, and traditional web-based browser games to their JumpStart catalogue. That year, JumpStart was advertised as offering the first browser game with "high quality 3D graphics and advanced gameplay". James Czulewicz, Vice President of Sales and Planning at Knowledge Adventure said that JumpStart Pet Rescue, released in August 2009, was the "first educational product for the Wii." The trademark "JUMPSTART GET MOVING" was issued by the United States Patent and Trademark Office on November 23, 2010. On February 19, 2011, Knowledge Adventure announced that the JumpStart brand had entered the console market by making Crazy Karts for  Wii (released in February); and Deep Sea Escape (released in March) and Legend of Lost Island for the Nintendo DS (released in March). On October 6, 2011, Knowledge Adventure announced that the  launch of casual gaming brand Twisted Games. The company had previously entered the mobile gaming market with 2010's JumpStart Preschool Magic of Learning, which was followed by other JumpStart and Math Blaster titles. On October 9, 2012, Knowledge Adventure announced that it was changing its name to JumpStart Games. References to "JumpStart" after this date often refer to the successor to Knowledge Adventure, rather than the Jumpstart series specifically. On July 3, 2017, JumpStart Games was acquired by a Chinese company, NetDragon Websoft.

Design

Plot and gameplay 
The purpose of the bulk of their games is to drill young players in specific subjects and skills, as required by elementary and secondary school curriculum. These drills are often embedded within entertaining gameplay. The storylines typically involve one or more animated characters facing a problem and asking the player for help; therefore, the games are goal oriented. The storylines are, by design, shallow and keep the player focused on gameplay.

Art 
The art and animations for Fanfare Studio's early games were virtually paperless, being rendered with a mouse and tablet. Additional artwork was done by Knowledge Adventure's in-house and contract artist Ann Pickard for their first three games and, previous to the advent of 3D compute graphics, for their early games, Maurice Kimball drew the backgrounds.

During the mid-90s, former musician and BigFins band member David Rees joined Knowledge Adventure as Art Director and music composer until his leave in 2002.

Vivendi Universal Games artist Marcela Cabrera did the illustrations for the games around 1998 and directed the art for the games developed the following year.

The backgrounds for the JumpStart World games were sketched and lined by the lead artist and illustrator Maurice Kimball.

The backgrounds for the JumpStart SpyMasters games were sketched, hand drawn and inked by Brian White while animator Brian Reynolds worked on the flash animation for the background objects and characters.

Educational goals 
The concept behind the JumpStart Learning System was to keep track of a student's successes and struggles, all while teaching an entire grade or subject through a proper balance of puzzles, games and education.

To cater to different audiences and student goals, Jumpstart binned their products into three categories:

 Grade-based products, covering all topics typically taught in a single year of elementary or secondary school
 Subject-based products, focusing on specific topics 
 Learning products, teaching basics while exploring a whole new world

The series' "rigorous methodology" includes input from kids advisory teams, family testing, child development specialists, teachers, and educational experts.

In addition, Knowledge Adventure developed three techniques behind their products:

JumpStart Assessment Technology - To customize individual skill levels.
JumpStart Adaptive Learning Technology - To customize program difficulty levels to coincide with a user's abilities.
JumpStart Tutor Technology - To help a user overcome any obstacles.

In 1995, JumpStart claimed to be the first educational software series to cover entire curricula by grade level, and that this was achieved through reinforcing classroom lessons with cartoon guides. For instance, in JumpStart First Grade, "children ages 5-7 learn 92 educational skills in 18 modules teaching math, geography, science and reading comprehension from eight interactive books with 52 illustrated stories". These "curriculum and skills products" introduced several innovative edutainment features, such as Progress Reports (allowing parents and teachers to track progress) and Adaptive Learning (allowing the game to automatically change in difficulty based on the player's performance).

The developers believe it is vital to achieving the proper balance between education and entertainment. Diana Pray, the senior producer of JumpStart titles, said "we give [the player] enough story to make them feel like they are in a game", while offering reward-based incentives to encourage progress. While noting that the "dominant theory since the infancy of the [edutainment] genre has been to sugarcoat the academic drudgery and make learning child's play", The Washington Post reporter Don Oldenburg, the newspaper noted that JumpStart was more "overtly educational" than most, offering grade-specific, curriculum-oriented products, adding that Knowledge Adventure had "got the jump on the industry" by being the first mover in the summer of that year. In 2011, Knowledge Adventure President and CEO David Lord said that "JumpStart and Math Blaster have already helped millions of English speaking students and English Language learners discover that learning can be fun".

Products in the franchise

Compilations

Reception

Critical reception
JumpStart Study Helpers Math Booster and Spelling Bee were notable for allowing users to edit the math problems or words used in gameplay. Carolyn Handler Miller of Digital Storytelling: A Creator's Guide to Interactive Entertainment, wrote that the series "found just the right balance between storyline and other demands of educational titles". The series has reputation for providing "safe, age appropriate" games for children. The Houston Chronicle praised the series for "offer[ing] many and varied academic activities, plenty of play-oriented pursuits, incentives to spur and reward achievement and all the interactive trimmings – cool characters, great 3-D graphics and snappy sound effects", describing the World Kindergarten, 1st Grade and 2nd Grade as superlative pieces of educational software.

Commercial performance
Knowledge Adventure made $35 million in sales in 1994 by selling titles such as JumpStart Kindergarten and Bug Adventures.

JumpStart Kindergarten was 8th most popular titles in the CD-ROM category in the Washington area in the week ending October 14, 1995, and 9th in the week ending May 4, 1996. Throughout 1997, JumpStart Toddlers took in over $4 million. In the first half of 1997 four of the top five educational titles for Windows were JumpStart products, while four of the top ten DOS/Windows home education titles were JumpStart. Two of the top selling retail CD Roms of August 1997 were JumpStart products (5th and 6th), after Microsoft Windows 95 Upgrade, Norton Utilities, Myst, and Viruscan. JumpStart 1st Grade (3rd), JumpStart Adventures 3rd Grade (4th), JumpStart 2nd Grade (5th), JumpStart Kindergarten II (6th), JumpStart Preschool (7th), JumpStart Adventures Fourth Grade (8th), JumpStart Toddlers were within the top-selling educational software across 13 U.S. software retail chains in the week ending September 19, 1998. Jumpstart Preschool (2nd), Jumpstart First Grade (3rd), Jumpstart Kindergarten (7th), and Jumpstart Second Grade (8th) were among the top-selling home-education software across 13 software retail chains in the week ending May 1, 1999.

By 2002, the series sold over 13 million units.

Awards and nominations 
As of 2017, the series won over 300 awards.

|-
| 1998
| JumpStart Spanish
| Parent's Choice Gold Award
| 
|-
| 1999
| JumpStart Adventures 6th Grade
| Parent's Choice Gold Award
| 
|-
| 2001
| JumpStart Languages
| Parent's Choice Silver Honor
| 
|-
| 2003
| JumpStart Study Helpers: Spelling Bee
| National Parenting Seal of Approval
| 
|-
| 2005
| JumpStart Reading with Karaoke
| National Parenting Seal of Approval
| 
|-
| 2005
| JumpStart Reading With Karaoke
| Parent's Choice Silver Honor
| 
|-
| 2007
| JumpStart World: Kindergarten
| Parent's Choice Recommended
| 
|-
| 2007
| JumpStart World: First Grade
| Parent's Choice
| 
|-
| 2007
| JumpStart World: Second Grade
| Parent's Choice Recommended
| 
|-
| 2007
| JumpStart World 1st Grade
| iParenting Media Award
| 
|-
| 2007
| JumpStart World 2nd Grade
| iParenting Media Award
| 
|-
| 2008
| JumpStart World Kindergarten
| Silver Recipient
| 
|-
| 2008
| JumpStart Advanced Preschool World
| Toy Man Award of Excellence & eChoice Award
| 
|-
| 2008
|  
| Toy Man Award of Excellence & eChoice Award
| 
|-
| 2008
|  
| Toy Man Award of Excellence & eChoice Award
| 
|-
| 2008
|? 
| iParenting Media Awards
| 
|-
| 2008
| JumpStart World Kindergarten 
| The Toy Man Award of Excellence
| 
|-
| 2008
| JumpStart 3D Virtual World: The Legend of Grizzly McGuffin
| National Parenting Seal of Approval
| 
|-
| 2008
| JumpStart 3D Virtual World: Quest for the Color Meister
| National Parenting Seal of Approval
| 
|-
| 2008
| JumpStart 3D Virtual World: Trouble in Town
| National Parenting Seal of Approval
| 
|-
| 2008
| JumpStart 3D Virtual World: My First Adventure
| National Parenting Seal of Approval
| 
|-
| 2008
| JumpStart Advanced Preschool World Premium Edition
| National Parenting Seal of Approval
| 
|-
| 2008
| JumpStart World
| National Parenting Seal of Approval
| 
|-
| 2011
| Jumpstart.com
| National Parenting Seal of Approval
| 
|-
| 2012
| Jumpstart
| National Parenting Seal of Approval
| 
|-
| 2013
| JumpStart 3D Virtual World
| 2013 ON for Learning Award
| 
|}

References

External links

 
Video game franchises
Phonics curricula
Children's educational video games
Video game franchises introduced in 1994
Video games developed in the United States